He Ain't Heavy, He's My Father is a Hong Kong film, also known as 新難兄難弟 or He Ain't Heavy, He's My Brother.

He Ain't Heavy, He's My Father may also refer to:

 "He Ain't Heavy, He's My Father", an episode of Dharma & Greg
 "He Ain't Heavy, He's My Father", an episode of Roc

See also 
 He Ain't Heavy (disambiguation)
 He Ain't Heavy, He's My Brother (disambiguation)
 She Ain't Heavy (disambiguation)
 "He Ain't Heavy, Father...", an episode of The Cavanaughs
 "I Ain't Heavy, I'm Your Father", an episode of The Hughleys